The Armenian Weightlifting Federation, is the regulating body of weightlifting in Armenia, governed by the Armenian Olympic Committee. The headquarters of the federation is located in Yerevan.

History
The Federation was established in 1922 and the current president is Pashik Alaverdyan. The Federation is a full member of the International Weightlifting Federation and the European Weightlifting Federation.

Armenian weightlifting athletes participate in the World Weightlifting Championships, the European Weightlifting Championships, as well as weightlifting at the Summer Olympics.

On 21 April 2022, it was announced the 2023 European Weightlifting Championships would be held in Yerevan.

See also
 Armenian Powerlifting Federation
 Sport in Armenia
 Weightlifting in Armenia

References

External links 
 Armenian Weightlifting Federation on Facebook

Sports governing bodies in Armenia
Weightlifting in Armenia
National members of the European Weightlifting Federation